The 1990 Irish Masters was the sixteenth edition of the professional invitational snooker tournament, which took place from 27 March to 1 April 1990. The tournament was played at Goffs in Kill, County Kildare, and featured twelve professional players.

Steve Davis won the title for the fifth time, beating Dennis Taylor 9–4 in the final.

Main draw

References

Irish Masters
Irish Masters
Irish Masters
Irish Masters
Irish Masters